Dieter Goltzsche (born 1934 in Dresden) is a German painter and graphic designer. He won the Hans-Theo-Richter-Preis of the Sächsische Akademie der Künste in 2010.

Exhibitions (selection) 
 1964 Kunstkabinett des Instituts für Lehrerweiterbildung, Berlin
 1967 Leonhardi-Museum, Dresden
 1968 Galerie im Turm, Berlin; Wort und Werk, Leipzig; Städtische Kunstsammlungen, Görlitz
 1982 Altes Museum, Berlin; Galerie Schmidt-Rottluff, Karl-Marx-Stadt; Kupferstichkabinett Berlin; Berlin State Museums
 1985 Galerie im Cranachhaus, Weimar
 1986 Galerie Oben, Karl-Marx-Stadt
 1988 Galerie der Deutschen Bücherstube, Berlin
 1989 galerie erph, Erfurt
 1990 Galerie Oevermann, Frankfurt am Main
 1991 Galerie Mitte, Berlin; Galerie Beethovenstraße, Düsseldorf
 1992 Käthe Kollwitz Museum, Cologne; Kunstmuseum Basel; Neue Pinakothek, Munich, with Gerhard Altenbourg, Carlfriedrich Claus, Sabina Grzimek, Claus Weidensdorfer and Peter Graf
 1993 Brecht-Haus Weißensee, Berlin
 1994 Galerie Beethovenstraße, Düsseldorf; Galerie der Berliner Graphikpresse, Berlin
 1998 Neuer Berliner Kunstverein, Berlin
 2000 Galerie Beethovenstraße, Düsseldorf; Galerie Brusberg, Berlin; Academy of Arts, Berlin
 2004 Leonhardi-Museum, Dresden; Galerie Parterre, Berlin

Honours and awards 
 1978 Käthe Kollwitz Prize by the Akademie der Künste der DDR
 1989 Art Prize of the German Democratic Republic
 1990 Member of the Academy of Arts, Berlin
 1998 Hannah-Höch-Prize by the city of Berlin
 2010 Hans-Theo-Richter-Prize by the Sächsische Akademie der Künste

See also
 List of German painters

References

20th-century German painters
20th-century German male artists
German male painters
21st-century German painters
21st-century German male artists
1934 births
Living people
Artists from Dresden
German graphic designers
Members of the Academy of Arts, Berlin